Christopher Ronald Dell (born 27 October 1960), is a former Australian cricketer who played first-class cricket for Tasmania in the 1985-86 Sheffield Shield competition. He was a bowler who bowled left arm fast medium. He played for Devonport Cricket Club in the Tasmanian Grade Cricket competition.

He made his first-class debut against South Australia at the Adelaide Oval on 10 January 1986, as cover for the overseas professional, West Indian fast bowler Winston Davis who was out injured. Dell returned 0/40 off his six overs in the first innings, and did not seem to trouble any of the South Australian batsmen. His second innings figures of 0/33 off six overs were not much better, and the Tasmanian selectors concluded that he wasn't up to the quality required for Sheffield Shield cricket. He returned to play for his hometown side, Devonport, where he had a successful career as an all-rounder. For Devonport he scored 6194 runs at an average of 28.03 to become their second highest all-time run scorer, and also took 405 wickets at 19.11 to become their fourth highest ever wicket taker. Dell also took 111 catches for his club side.

Following his retirement from playing Christopher Dell took up a position as coach of Devonport Orions in his hometown.

References

External links

1960 births
Living people
Tasmania cricketers
Australian cricketers
People from Devonport, Tasmania
Cricketers from Tasmania